The Boondocks is an American adult animated sitcom created by Aaron McGruder, based upon his comic strip of the same name, The show begins with an Afro-American family, the Freemans, settling into the fictional, peaceful, and mostly white suburb of Woodcrest from Chicago's South Side. The perspective offered by this mixture of cultures, lifestyles, social classes, stereotypes, viewpoints and races provides for much of the series' satire, comedy, and conflict.

The series was broadcast on Adult Swim; premiering on November 6, 2005 and concluding on June 23, 2014 after four seasons and 55 episodes. The series also airs in syndication outside the United States and has been released on various DVD sets and other forms of home media.

Series overview

Episodes

Season 1 (2005–06)

Season 2 (2007–08)

Season 3 (2010)

Season 4 (2014)

References

External links
The Boondocks official website 
Adult Swim's Boondocks page
 
 

 
Lists of American adult animated television series episodes
Lists of American sitcom episodes